Cooked is a 2016 original Netflix documentary series created by Alex Gibney based on the book by Michael Pollan with the same title, starring Michael Pollan and Isaac Pollan. It explains the history and different aspects of cooking, and its ability to connect us as human beings.

Premise
In 'Cooked', Michael Pollan explores food past and present through the four elemental categories — fire, water, air and earth. The series is based on Pollan's book with same title.

Cast
 Michael Pollan

Release
It was released on February 2, 2016 on Netflix streaming.

References

External links
 
 
 

2016 American television series debuts
2016 American television series endings
2010s American documentary television series
English-language Netflix original programming
Netflix original documentary television series